The Punjab Legislative Assembly or the Punjab Vidhan Sabha is the unicameral legislature of the state of Punjab in India. Sixteenth Punjab Legislative Assembly was constituted in March 2022. At present, it consists of 117 members, directly elected from 117 single-seat constituencies.  The tenure of the Legislative Assembly is five years unless dissolved sooner. The current Speaker of the Assembly is Kultar Singh Sandhwan. The meeting place of the Legislative Assembly since 6 March 1961 is the Vidhan Bhavan in Chandigarh.

History

British Raj 
An Executive Council was formed under The Indian Councils Act, 1861. It was only under the Government of India Act 1919 that a Legislative Council was set up in Punjab.  Later, under the Government of India Act 1935, the Punjab Legislative Assembly was constituted with a membership of 175. It was summoned for the first time on 1 April 1937. In 1947, Punjab Province was partitioned into West Punjab and East Punjab and the East Punjab Legislative Assembly was formed, the forerunner of the current assembly consisting of 79 members.

1947 – present 
On 15 July 1948, eight princely states of East Punjab grouped together to form a single state, Patiala and East Punjab States Union. The Punjab State Legislature was a bicameral house in April 1952, comprising the Vidhan Sabha (lower house) and Vidhan Parishad (upper house). In 1956 that state was largely merged into Punjab, the strength of the Vidhan Parishad of the new State of Punjab was enhanced from 40 seats to 46 seats and in 1957, it was increased to 51. Punjab was trifurcated in 1966 to form Haryana, Himachal Pradesh, and Punjab. The Vidhan Parishad was reduced to 40 seats and the Vidhan Sabha was grown by 50 seats to 104 seats. On 1 January 1970, the Vidhan Parishad was abolished leaving the state with a unicameral legislature.

Election results

Pre-Independence
Punjab Legislative Council

Punjab Provincial Assembly

Post-Independence

 ^ - Party didn't contest election
 ~ - Party didn't exist
 Green color box indicates the party/parties who formed the government
 Red color box indicates the official opposition party

List of Assemblies

Council of Lieutenant-Governor of Punjab (1897-1920)

Punjab Legislative Council (1921-1936)

Punjab Legislative Assembly

State under President's rule

See also 
PEPSU
Interim East Punjab Assembly
List of governors of Punjab (India)
List of constituencies of Punjab Legislative Assembly
List of Deputy Chief Ministers of Punjab (India)
List of Speakers of Punjab Legislative Assembly
List of Leader of Opposition in Punjab Legislative Assembly

References

External links
 

 
Unicameral legislatures